Rade Basta (born 21 February 1979) is a Serbian politician serving as minister of economy since 2022. A member of United Serbia (JS), he served as a member of the National Assembly of Serbia from August to October 2022.

Born in Novi Sad, he graduated from the University of Novi Sad in 2002. He was an advisor to Srđan Kružević during his tenure as the director of Elektrovojvodina, a deputy provincial secretary for energy, and briefly a member of the City Assembly of Novi Sad in 2016. As of 2018, he has been the president of Belgrade Power Plants, a public communal company. He was an associate during Goran Vesić's tenure as deputy mayor of Belgrade. He is a supporter of nuclear power while he also argued that Serbia should establish a scientific-research center for nuclear technologies with the United States and European Union, and that Serbia should build a nuclear power plant.

Early life 
Basta was born on 21 February 1979 in Novi Sad, Socialist Republic of Serbia, Socialist Federal Republic of Yugoslavia. He finished his secondary education at a school in Sremska Kamenica, graduated from the University of Novi Sad in 2002, and earned his master's degree from the University of the Academy of Commerce in Novi Sad in 2012.

Career 
He began his career as a worker at the ministry of internal affairs in 1998; he worked there until 2005. Basta worked as an adviser to Srđan Kružević, a former United Serbia (JS) member, when Kružević was the director of Elektrovojvodina. Basta was later appointed deputy provincial secretary for energy in July 2016. He was elected member of the City Assembly of Novi Sad in 2016 but resigned shortly afterwards. At the end of 2016, he was appointed president of the JS branch in Vojvodina. In September 2018, he became the president of the Belgrade Power Plants, a public communal company. He is currently the deputy president of the JS. 

Marko Bastać, then a member of the Party of Freedom and Justice (SSP), accused Basta of leading security guards that allegedly beat a group of people after the promotion of Goran Vesić's book in October 2019. During Vesić's tenure as deputy mayor of Belgrade, Basta served as his associate. Basta was elected to the City Assembly of Belgrade after the 2022 Belgrade City Assembly election, although he resigned shortly after. He was elected to the National Assembly of Serbia after the snap 2022 Serbian parliamentary election. As a member of the JS parliamentary group, he served as a member of the committee on defence an internal affairs and committee for agriculture, forestry, and water management; he was also a deputy member of the committee for finance, republic budget, and control of spending of public funds. He resigned from his position as a member of the National Assembly on 25 October 2022.

Minister of Economy 
Initially speculated to be appointed as a minister of agriculture, forestry and water economy, it was announced on 23 October 2022 that he would serve as a minister of economy instead. He was sworn in on 26 October, succeeding Anđelka Atanasković.

Political positions 
Basta is a supporter of nuclear power and argued that Serbia should build a nuclear power plant to ensure a stable supply of electricity. He also proposed that the government of Serbia should establish the National Corporation for Atomic Energy. He also stated that the Serbian-Russian Humanitarian Center in Niš should be abolished, and that Serbia needs to open a scientific-research center for nuclear technologies with the United States and European Union. Basta supports sanctioning Russia due to their invasion of Ukraine.

Personal life 
By profession, Basta claims to be an economist. He was formerly a kickboxer, a policeman, and a professor of physical education. He received the "Captain Miša Anastasijević" award in December 2012 for his contribution to the development of entrepreneurship and social creativity. He served as the director of FK Radnički Niš from December 2016 to November 2017. He resides in Belgrade.

References 

1979 births
Living people
People from Belgrade
United Serbia politicians
Government ministers of Serbia
21st-century Serbian politicians
Members of the National Assembly (Serbia)